Bernie Anderson is a former American football coach. He served as the head football coach at Michigan Technological University from 1987 to 2005 and Northern Michigan University from 2006 to 2011, compiling a career college football coaching record of 117–134.

Head coaching record

College

References

Year of birth missing (living people)
Living people
Michigan Tech Huskies football coaches
Northern Michigan Wildcats football coaches
Western Michigan Broncos football coaches
High school football coaches in Wisconsin